Saif Group is a Pakistani conglomerate company largely focused on textile industry and is owned by Saifullah Khan family.

It is based in Islamabad and is involved in power, health care, textiles, real estate and telecommunications.

Major projects of the group
Saif Group of Companies manages and owns 11 companies.

Health Care
Its health care division Saif Healthcare Limited owns and manages:

Kulsum International Hospital – a comprehensive cardiology facility located on Islamabad’s Blue Area's primary thoroughfare Khayaban-e-Quaid-e-Azam Jinnah Avenue to deliver services to the rising demand for private sector health care in the Federal Capital Region.

Textile Division
Its textile division owns and manages three companies: 
Saif Textile Mills Limited, with installed capacity of 88,476 spindles is located at Gadoon Amazai in the Swabi district, Khyber Pakhtunkhwa, Saif Textile Mills is a public traded company which is headquartered in Rawalpindi and majority owned by Saif Group.
Kohat Textile Mills with installed capacity of 44,400 spindles is located in Kohat, and Mediterranean Textile Company is located in Egypt; it has an installed capacity of 63,312 spindles for the production of 100% cotton yarn.

Energy Division
Pakistan depends on natural gas to meet nearly half of its energy needs. Oil takes care of nearly 30% of its requirements. As a country, Pakistan remains underexplored for oil compared to the rest of the world largely because power generated from river resources (hydel power) and natural gas are cheaper to develop: Jehangir Saifullah Khan is in charge of day-to-day operations in the Energy Division.
Saif Power Ltd (SPL) is a 225 MW Combined Cycle Thermal Power Project in the Sahiwal District of Punjab, Pakistan.
Saif Cement Ltd (SCL) is a project under development combining cement ingredient production with a waste-based energy project. The project has acquired a site in Dera Ismail Khan, Khyber Pakhtunkhwa. The proposed product would be Cement clinker an intermediate ingredient used by Pakistan's cement industry. The technology is being provided by Lafarge.
Saif Energy Limited (SEL) holds interests in 4 blocks with a total oil and gas exploration acreage of 3109.66 km2 in consortium with other energy and power companies, including Pakistan's state-owned Oil and Gas Development Company OGDCL (Pakistan), Mari Petroleum Company Limited MPCL (Pakistan), and Tullow Oil (Ireland). They brought the first GSM phone service to Pakistan in 1994 in a venture with Motorola, named as Mobilink but the Saif Group  sold its stakes in 2007.

Real Estate Development

The Saif Group is developing an area of open land located near Islamabad International Airport into a luxury planned urban development in conjunction with the real estate investment company of Egypt's Sawiris family(EIGHTEEN ISLAMABAD) .

References

Companies based in Islamabad
Conglomerate companies of Pakistan
Conglomerate companies established in 1927
1927 establishments in British India
Saifullah Khan family
Indian companies established in 1927